Mark Samways (born 11 November 1968) is an English former professional footballer who made 364 appearances in the Football League playing as a goalkeeper for Doncaster Rovers, Scunthorpe United, York City and Darlington.

Career
Samways was born in Doncaster, and began his career in the youth system of hometown club Doncaster Rovers. He made his debut in the Third Division on 11 March 1988 in a 2–2 draw at home to Chester City. He was ever-present in the League in the 1989–90 season, before moving on to Scunthorpe United in March 1992, initially on loan. He was first-choice goalkeeper for that club for four-and-a-half seasons, and was voted Player of the Season for 1994–95. He spent time at York City and Darlington, and had an unsuccessful trial back at Doncaster, before moving into non-League football with Matlock Town and Frickley Athletic.

In 2012, Samways was coaching at Doncaster Rovers' Centre of Excellence.

References

External links

1968 births
Living people
Footballers from Doncaster
English footballers
Association football goalkeepers
Doncaster Rovers F.C. players
Scunthorpe United F.C. players
York City F.C. players
Darlington F.C. players
Matlock Town F.C. players
Frickley Athletic F.C. players
English Football League players